Cameron Latu (February 24, 2000) is an American football tight end for the Alabama Crimson Tide in the SEC.

Early life and high school career
Latu grew up in Chisholm, Minnesota and primarily played rugby originally. His family moved to Salt Lake City, Utah in 2013 and attended Olympus High School. Cameron has an fraternal twin brother named Nathan who plays football at Oklahoma State at defensive end.  Also has an older brother Sioka who lives with his family in Utah. Mother Jillene Argust-Fine resides in Utah as well. His Father Viliami Latu lives in California. 

As a junior, he record 65 tackles with 20 tackles for loss and nine sacks on defense as well as 14 catches for 175 yards and two touchdowns on the offensive side of the ball, helping lead the team to a 8-3 record and playoff berth. He had originally committed to play at BYU along with his identical twin brother but reopened his commitment after a senior year where he had 45 tackles with 8 tackles for loss and 3 sacks on defense and 10 catches for 168 yards and 1 touchdown, 5 rushes for 34 yards rushing on offense and a kick return for 75 yards on special teams. Latu committed to play college football at Alabama over offers from Nebraska, USC, Utah, and 19 other schools.

College career
In 2018, Latu redshirted his true freshman season after playing in two games and recording a tackle in his college debut vs Louisville.

In 2019, Latu moved positions from linebacker to tight end before his redshirt freshman season to add much needed depth for the Crimson Tide. Latu would see time in 11 games mostly on special teams.

In 2020, Latu played on primarily special teams and begun to carve out a role at tight end as a redshirt sophomore playing in 12 games.

In 2021, Latu was named the Crimson Tide's starting tight end going into his redshirt junior season. Latu caught three passes for 43 yards with two touchdowns in a 44–13 win over Miami in the Chick-fil-A Kickoff Game. Against Southern Miss Latu scored a touchdown by standing in the end zone and picking up a ball fumbled by John Metchie. Latu would finish his redshirt junior season with a strong showing against Georgia in the College Football Championship game with a career high five catches for 102 yards and one touchdown after Jameson Williams went down with a knee injury.

References

External links
Alabama Crimson Tide bio

2000 births
Living people
American football tight ends
American football linebackers
Alabama Crimson Tide football players
Players of American football from Utah
Players of American football from Minnesota